Brendon Paul Julian (born 10 August 1970) is a cricket commentator and former Australian cricketer. He played in 7 Tests and 25 ODIs from 1993 to 1999. He was an AIS Australian Cricket Academy scholarship holder in 1989.

Standing at 6' 5", he was a dangerous left-arm fast-medium bowler and a tremendously hard-hitting right-handed late-middle order batsman, he was regarded as a prospect to become an all-rounder.

Domestic career
He is particularly remembered for the Sheffield Shield finals of 1997–98 and 1998–99, in which innings of 124 and 84 respectively played major roles in leading the Western Warriors to back-to-back titles.

International career

He had two short spells in the Australian Test team. His first stint was in the 1993 Ashes tour against England when he scored a gritty 56*, and secondly his tight and penetrative bowling spells in the history making West Indies tour of 1995 when in the absence of injured Craig McDermott and Damien Fleming, he and Paul Reiffel undertook new ball responsibilities.

He was a regular member of the One-day team during 1998 and 1999, being a member of the winning squad at the 1999 Cricket World Cup, despite being confined to the bench for the majority of the tournament. He was dropped after the tournament.

Commentary career
He retired in 2001 to become a presenter in the travel programme Getaway for Channel 9 in Australia. He later presented sports news on National Nine News, before moving to Fox Sports. On Fox Sports he is a commentator on domestic cricket matches, host of 'Inside Cricket' and hosting Australia's 2009 and 2018 tours of South Africa.

References

External links

1970 births
Living people
Australia One Day International cricketers
Australia Test cricketers
Cricketers at the 1999 Cricket World Cup
Australian television presenters
Western Australia cricketers
Surrey cricketers
People educated at Guildford Grammar School
Cricketers from Hamilton, New Zealand
Australian cricketers
Australian Institute of Sport cricketers
Australian sports journalists
New Zealand emigrants to Australia
Commonwealth Games medallists in cricket
Commonwealth Games silver medallists for Australia
Cricketers at the 1998 Commonwealth Games
Medallists at the 1998 Commonwealth Games
Australian cricket commentators